Johannes "Johan" Devrindt (born 14 April 1945) is a retired Belgian football player.

Club career
He played for Anderlecht, Dutch outfit PSV Eindhoven, Club Brugge, Lokeren, Winterslag and La Louviere before hanging up his boots after suffering relegation with second division Tienen.

International career
Devrindt made his debut for Belgium in a September 1964 friendly match against Holland with 10 fellows from the Anderlecht team after the substitution of goalkeeper Delhasse by Jean-Marie Trappeniers and has earned a total of 23 caps, scoring 15 goals. He has represented his country in 5 FIFA World Cup qualification matches and at the 1970 FIFA World Cup.

His final international was a September 1975 UEFA Euro 1976 qualifying match against East Germany.

Honours

Club 
RSC Anderlecht

 Belgian First Division: 1964–65, 1965–66, 1966–67, 1967–68
 Belgian Cup: 1964–65
 Inter-Cities Fairs Cup runners-up: 1969–70

Club Brugge 

 Belgian First Division: 1972–73
 Jules Pappaert Cup: 1972

Individual 

 FIFA World Cup 1970 qualification – UEFA Group 6 top scorer
 UEFA Euro 1972 qualifying Group 5 top scorer

References

External links
 Profile & stats - Lokeren
 Profile & stats - FC Brugge
 ZStats - PSV

1944 births
Living people
People from Overpelt
Association football forwards
Belgian footballers
Belgium international footballers
1970 FIFA World Cup players
R.S.C. Anderlecht players
PSV Eindhoven players
Club Brugge KV players
K.S.C. Lokeren Oost-Vlaanderen players
K.F.C. Winterslag players
R.A.A. Louviéroise players
Belgian Pro League players
Eredivisie players
Expatriate footballers in the Netherlands
Footballers from Limburg (Belgium)